The Black Watch Polo team has won numerous tournaments throughout the US. Entering competition at the high goal 26 level in 2004, Black Watch has enjoyed success by reaching the finals of the 2004 US Gold Cup, and the 2005 CV Whitney Cup. They were also successful in winning the 2007 Hall of Fame Cup.

Neil Hirsch, the team owner was an American businessman and resides in Wellington, Florida. The team is currently sponsored by Ralph Lauren.

History
The team is named after the Scottish Black Watch regiment that served the British Crown for 266 years.

Team formed by:
 Bautista Heguy
 Nacho Figueras
 Matias MacDonough
 Francisco De Narvaez (Jr)

Achievements

See also
Polo

External links
BlackWatch Polo Team

Polo clubs in the United States